Slugdge is a British extreme metal band, formed in Lancashire, England, in 2012. Originally a studio project headed by former No Sin Evades His Gaze guitarist Kevin Pearson and vocalist Matthew Moss, in 2018 the group expanded into a full lineup with the addition of No Sin Evades His Gaze bassist Matthew Lowe, and The Black Dahlia Murder drummer Alan Cassidy. The group has released four studio albums to date.

History
Slugdge was originally formed by friends Kevin Pearson and Matt Moss in 2012, as a response to the amount of sludge metal groups named after animals. Inspired by Akercocke, the group themed their songs around a fictional cosmic slug deity called "Mollusca". They released their first three albums, Born of Slime (2013), Gastronomicon (2014) and Dim & Slimeridden Kingdoms (2015) independently through Bandcamp (the latter two being featured by Stereogum's best of lists for their respective years), before signing to Willowtip Records in 2017.

The band released their fourth album, Esoteric Malacology, on 2 March 2018 via Willowtip. The album was exclusively streamed via MetalSucks.net in the days leading up to the release. Shortly after the album's release, which topped Bandcamp's metal chart, the pair unveiled Matthew Lowe as the group's full-time bassist. Then, on 9 April 2018, the full lineup was completed by the arrival of Alan Cassidy of The Black Dahlia Murder on drums.

Members
Matthew Moss – vocals, guitars (2012–present)
Kevin Pearson – guitars (2012–present), bass, programming (2012–2018)
Matthew Lowe – bass (2018–present)
Alan Cassidy – drums (2018–present)

Discography
Studio albums
Born of Slime (2013, self-released)
Gastronomicon (2014, self-released)
Dim & Slimeridden Kingdoms (2015, self-released)
Esoteric Malacology (2018, Willowtip)

Extended Plays
Slug Life (2015, self-released)

Compilations
The Cosmic Cornucopia (2015, self-released)

References

Musical groups established in 2012
British heavy metal musical groups
Extreme metal musical groups
Sludge metal musical groups
2012 establishments in England